The Sony SmartWatch is a line of wearable devices developed and marketed by Sony Mobile from 2012 to 2016 through three generations. They connect to Android smartphones and can display information such as Twitter feeds and SMS messages, among other things.

Original

The original Sony SmartWatch, model MN2SW, came with a flexible silicone wristband with multiple colors available. It was introduced at CES 2012 and launched later in March 2012.

Sony SmartWatch 2
The Sony SmartWatch 2, model SW2, was launched in late September 2013.
The SW2 supports working together with any Android 4.0 (and higher) smartphone, unlike Samsung's competing Galaxy Gear smartwatch, which only works with some of Samsung's own Galaxy handsets. The watch features an aluminum body and comes with the option of a silicone or metal wristband, but can be used with any 24mm wristband. It is 1.65 inches tall by 1.61 inches wide by 0.35 inch thick, weighs 0.8 ounces and sports a transflective LCD screen with a 220x176 resolution. The SW2 connects to the smartphone using Bluetooth, and supports NFC for easy pairing. It is rated IP57 so it can be submersed in water up to a metre for 30 minutes and is dust resistant.

Sony SmartWatch 3

At IFA 2014 the company announced the Sony Smartwatch 3. Its processor switched from previous generations' ARM Cortex-M MCU to an ARM Cortex-A CPU.

As noted by ABI Research, "The SmartWatch 3 has many new features such as waterproof (IP68 rated, not just resistant), improved styling, transition to Android Wear, and introduction of a new wearable platform from Broadcom. ... [It's] based on the Broadcom system-on-chip (SoC) platform which includes a 1.2GHz Quad-core ARM Cortex A7 processor (BCM23550), an improved GPS and ambient light sensor processing SoC (BCM47531) capable of simultaneously tracking five satellite systems (GPS, GLONASS, QZSS, SBAS, and BeiDou), the now popular Wi-Fi 802.11n/BT/NFC/FM quad-combo connectivity chip (BCM43341), and a highly integrated power management IC (BCM59054)."

Several apps are capable of using the Smartwatch 3's GPS, including:
 Google MyTracks (since 2014, December)
 RunKeeper (since 2014, December)
 Endomondo (since 2015, March)
 iFit
 Ghostracer (can upload to Strava)
 Strava (Beta)
 Rambler

The watch is also capable of tracking swimming with swim.com and golf swings with vimoGolf.

The Sony SmartWatch 3 will not be upgraded to version 2.0 of Android Wear.

Model comparison

See also
Smartwatch
Pebble (watch)
Moto 360 (2nd generation), a smartwatch by Motorola
Sony Ericsson LiveView
Samsung Galaxy Gear

References

External links

Coverage: The Verge Gizmodo Computerworld Engadget

Smartwatch 3
Sony hardware
Smartwatches